The 2009 IRB Junior World Championship (known as the 2009 IRB Toshiba Junior World Championship for sponsorship reasons) was the second annual international rugby union competition for Under 20 national teams, this competition replaces the now defunct under 19 and under 21 world championships. The event was organised by rugby's governing body, the International Rugby Board (IRB). The competition was contested by 16 men's junior national teams and was held in June 2009. It was hosted by Japan.

Venues

Pool Stage

Pool A

{| class="wikitable" style="text-align: center;"
|-
!width="200"|Team
!width="20"|Pld
!width="20"|W
!width="20"|D
!width="20"|L
!width="20"|TF
!width="20"|PF
!width="20"|PA
!width="25"|+/-
!width="20"|BP
!width="20"|Pts
|-
|align=left| 
|3||3||0||0||22||140||9||+131||2||14
|-
|align=left| 
|3||2||0||1||8||61||26||+35||1||9
|-
|align=left| 
|3||1||0||2||5||51||79||-28||2||6
|-
|align=left| 
|3||0||0||3||2||15||153||-138||0||0
|}

Pool B

{| class="wikitable" style="text-align: center;"
|-
!width="200"|Team
!width="20"|Pld
!width="20"|W
!width="20"|D
!width="20"|L
!width="20"|TF
!width="20"|PF
!width="20"|PA
!width="25"|+/-
!width="20"|BP
!width="20"|Pts
|-
|align=left| 
|3||3||0||0||17||125||14||+111||3||15
|-
|align=left| 
|3||2||0||1||7||53||86||-33||1||9
|-
|align=left| 
|3||1||0||2||4||33||54||-21||1||5
|-
|align=left| 
|3||0||0||3||5||27||84||-57||2||2
|}

Pool C

{| class="wikitable" style="text-align: center;"
|-
!width="200"|Team
!width="20"|Pld
!width="20"|W
!width="20"|D
!width="20"|L
!width="20"|TF
!width="20"|PF
!width="20"|PA
!width="25"|+/-
!width="20"|BP
!width="20"|Pts
|-
|align=left| 
|3||3||0||0||19||144||40||+104||3||15
|-
|align=left| 
|3||2||0||1||17||118||81||+37||2||10
|-
|align=left| 
|3||1||0||2||6||55||98||-43||0||4
|-
|align=left| 
|3||0||0||3||2||30||128||-98||1||1
|}

Pool D

{| class="wikitable" style="text-align: center;"
|-
!width="200"|Team
!width="20"|Pld
!width="20"|W
!width="20"|D
!width="20"|L
!width="20"|TF
!width="20"|PF
!width="20"|PA
!width="25"|+/-
!width="20"|BP
!width="20"|Pts
|-
|align=left| 
|3||3||0||0||24||164||11||+153||3||15
|-
|align=left| 
|3||2||0||1||14||107||58||+49||2||10
|-
|align=left| 
|3||1||0||2||7||47||111||-64||1||5
|-
|align=left| 
|3||0||0||3||5||35||173||-138||0||0
|}

Knockout stage

13th-place play-offs

Play-off Semi-finals

15th Place Final

13th Place Final

9th-place play-offs

Play-off Semi-finals

11th Place Final

9th Place Final

5th-place play-offs

Play-off Semi-finals

7th Place Final

5th Place Final

Championship play-offs

Championship Semi-finals

3rd Place Final

Championship Final

Final standings

See also
2009 IRB Junior World Rugby Trophy

External links
Official website

2009
International rugby union competitions hosted by Japan
2009 rugby union tournaments for national teams
2008–09 in Japanese rugby union
rugby union